Bloomfield is an unincorporated community in Morrow County, in the U.S. state of Ohio.

History
Bloomfield was platted in 1845. A post office called Bloomfield was established in 1834, and remained in operation until 1914.

References

Unincorporated communities in Morrow County, Ohio
1845 establishments in Ohio
Populated places established in 1845
Unincorporated communities in Ohio